Adams County/Ohio Valley School District is a public school district in Adams County, Ohio. It has a student population of 3,752 students. The superintendent is Richard Seas.

Grades PK-6
North Adams Elementary School (2295 Moores Rd, Seaman)
Peebles Elementary School (700 Peebles Indian Dr, Peebles)
West Union Elementary School (555 Lloyd Rd, West Union)

Grades 7-12
North Adams High School (96 Green Devil Dr, Seaman)
Peebles High School (144 Peebles Indian Dr, Peebles)
West Union High School (97 Dragon Lair Dr, West Union)

Grades 11-12
Ohio Valley Career and Technical Center (175 Lloyd Rd, West Union)

External links

North Adams Elementary School Website
Peebles Elementary School Website
West Union Elementary School Website
Ohio Valley Career and Technical Center Website
North Adams High School Website
Peebles High School Website
West Union High School Website

Education in Adams County, Ohio
School districts in Ohio